was a professional baseball player. He played pitcher, first base and outfield for the Dai Tokyo, Nagoya Baseball Club, and Tokyo Senators baseball teams from 1936 to 1939. He attended Waseda University.

He died in combat during military service in World War II, place and date of death unknown.

References

1917 births
Year of death unknown
Japanese baseball players
Japanese military personnel killed in World War II
Baseball people from Shizuoka Prefecture
Waseda University alumni
Nishitetsu Baseball Club players
Shochiku Robins players
Chunichi Dragons players
Japanese military personnel of World War II